In chemistry the descriptor vicinal (from Latin vicinus = neighbor), abbreviated vic, describes any two functional groups bonded to two adjacent carbon atoms (i.e., in a 1,2-relationship).

Relation of atoms in a molecule
For example, the molecule 2,3-dibromobutane carries two vicinal bromine atoms and 1,3-dibromobutane does not. Mostly, the use of the term vicinal is restricted to two identical functional groups.

Likewise in a gem-dibromide the prefix gem, an abbreviation of geminal, signals that both bromine atoms are bonded to the same atom (i.e., in a 1,1-relationship). For example, 1,1-dibromobutane is geminal.  While comparatively less common, the term hominal has been suggested as a descriptor for groups in a 1,3-relationship.

Like other such descriptors as syn, anti, exo or endo, the description vicinal helps explain how different parts of a molecule are related to each other either structurally or spatially. The vicinal adjective is sometimes restricted to those molecules with two identical functional groups. The use of the term can also be extended to substituents on aromatic rings.

1H NMR spectroscopy
In 1H NMR spectroscopy, the coupling of two hydrogen atoms on adjacent carbon atoms is called vicinal coupling. The vicinal coupling constant is referred to as 3J because the hydrogen atoms couple through three bonds. Depending on the other substituents, the vicinal coupling constant assumes values between 0 and +20 Hz. The dependence of the vicinal coupling constant on the dihedral angle  is described by the Karplus relation.

See also
Descriptor (Chemistry)
Geminal
Dextrorotation and levorotation
Chirality

References

Molecular geometry
Chemical nomenclature